Pignataro Interamna is a town and comune in the province of Frosinone, Lazio, Italy. It takes its name from the ancient Latin colony of Interamna Lirenas, founded by the Romans after the conquest of Casinum, an ancient Oscan city.
  
The town is in the southernmost part of the province of Frosinone.

Cities and towns in Lazio